Suicide squeeze may refer to:

 Squeeze play (baseball), a play in baseball in which the runner on third starts for home immediately while the batter attempts a bunt.
 Squeeze (bridge), a set of plays of the cards in contract bridge.
 Suicide Squeeze Records, a record label.
 Cannibal squeeze, a contract bridge squeeze also known as a suicide squeeze.
 "Suicide Squeeze", an episode of the TV series Castle